The Hearing Voices Movement (HVM) is the name used by organizations and individuals advocating the "hearing voices approach", an alternative way of understanding the experience of those people who "hear voices". In the medical professional literature, ‘voices’ are most often referred to as auditory verbal hallucinations. The movement uses the term ‘hearing voices’, which it feels is a more accurate and 'user-friendly' term.

The movement was instigated by Marius Romme, Sandra Escher and Patsy Hage in 1987. It challenges the notion that to hear voices is necessarily a characteristic of mental illness. Instead it regards hearing voices as a meaningful and understandable, although unusual, human variation. It therefore rejects the stigma and pathologisation of hearing voices and advocates human rights, social justice and support for people who hear voices that is empowering and recovery focused. The movement thus challenges the medical model of mental illness, specifically the validity of the schizophrenia construct.

History and tenets
The international Hearing Voices Movement is a prominent mental health service-user/survivor movement that promotes the needs and perspectives of experts by experience in the phenomenon of hearing voices (auditory verbal hallucinations). The main tenet of the Hearing Voices Movement is the notion that hearing voices is a meaningful human experience.

The Hearing Voices Movement regards itself and is regarded by others as being a post-psychiatric organisation. It positions itself outside of the mental health world in recognition that voices are an aspect of human difference, rather than a mental health problem.  One of the main issues of concern for the Hearing Voices Movement is empowerment and human rights as outlined in its Melbourne Hearing Voices Declaration 2013 and Thessaloniki Declaration 2014.

The Hearing Voices Movement also seeks holistic health solutions to problematic and overwhelming voices that cause mental distress. Based on their research, the movement espouses that many people successfully live with their voices. In themselves voices are not seen as the problem.  Rather it is the relationship the person has with their voices that is regarded as the main issue. Research indicates that mindfulness-based interventions can be beneficial for people distressed by hearing voices.

The Hearing Voices Movement has developed interventions for mental health practitioners to support people who hear voices and are overwhelmed by the experience.

Position
The position of the hearing voices movement can be summarised as follows:
Hearing voices is not in itself a sign of mental illness.
Hearing voices is part of the diversity of being a human, it is a faculty that is common (3-10% of the population will hear a voice or voices in their lifetime) and significant.
Hearing voices is experienced by many people who do not have symptoms that would lead to diagnosis of mental illness.
Hearing voices is often related to problems in life history.
If hearing voices causes distress, the person who hears the voices can learn strategies to cope with the experience. 
Coping is often achieved by confronting the past problems that lie behind the experience.

Theoretical overview
The work of Marius Romme, Sandra Escher and other researchers provides a theoretical framework for the movement. They find that:

 Not everyone who hears voices becomes a patient. Over a third of 400 voice hearers in the Netherlands they studied had not had any contact with psychiatric services. These people either described themselves as being able to cope with their voices and/or described their voices as life enhancing.
 Demographic (epidemiological) research provides evidence that there are people who hear voices in the general population (2%-6%) who are not necessarily troubled by them). Only a small minority fulfill the criteria for a psychiatric diagnosis and, of those, only a few seek psychiatric aid indicating that hearing voices in itself is not necessarily a symptom of an illness. Even more (about 8%) have peculiar delusions and do so without being ill.
 People who cope well with their voices and those who did not, show clear differences in terms of the nature of the relationship they had with their voices. 
 People who live well with their voice experience use different strategies to manage their voices than those voice hearers who are overwhelmed by them.
 70% of voice hearers reported that their voices had begun after a severe traumatic or intensely emotional event such as an accident, divorce or bereavement, sexual or physical abuse, love affairs, or pregnancy. Romme and colleagues found that the onset of voice hearing amongst a patient group was preceded by either a traumatic event or an event that activated the memory of an earlier trauma.
Specifically, there is a high correlation between voice hearing and abuse. These findings are being substantiated further in on-going studies with voice hearing amongst children.
 Some people who hear voices have a deep need to construct a personal understanding for their experiences and to talk to others about it without being designated as mad.

Romme, colleagues and other researchers find that people who hear voices can be helped using methods such as voice dialoguing cognitive behaviour therapy (CBT) and self-help methods.

Romme theorizes a three phase model of recovery:
 Startling  Initial confusion; emotional chaos, fear, helplessness and psychological turmoil.
 Organization  The need to find meaning, arrive at some understanding and acceptance. The development of ways of coping and accommodating voices in everyday living. This task may take months or years and is marked by the attempt to enter into active negotiation with the voice(s).
 Stabilisation  The establishment of equilibrium, and accommodation, with the voice(s), and the consequent re-empowerment of the person.

Alternative to medical model of disability
The Hearing Voices Movement disavows the medical model of disability and disapproves of the practises of mental health services through much of the Western world, such as treatment solely with medication.  For example, some service users have reported negative experiences of mental health services because they are discouraged from talking about their voices as these are seen solely as symptoms of psychiatric illness. Slade and Bentall conclude that the failure to attend to hallucinatory experiences and/or have the opportunity for dialogue about them is likely to have the effect of helping to maintain them.

In Voices of Reason, Voices of Insanity, Leudar and Thomas review nearly 3,000 years of voice-hearing history. They argue that the Western World has moved the experience of hearing voices from a socially valued context to a pathologised and denigrated one. Foucault has argued that this process can generally arise when a minority perspective is at odds with dominant social norms and beliefs.

Organisation
The Hearing Voices Movement was established in 1987 by Romme and Escher, both from the Netherlands, with the formation of Stichting Weerklank (Foundation Resonance), a peer led support organisation for people who hear voices. In 1988, the Hearing Voices Network was established in England with the active support of Romme. Since then, networks have been established in 35 countries.

INTERVOICE (The International Network for Training, Education and Research into Hearing Voices) is the organisation that provides coordination and support to the Hearing Voices Movement. It is supported by people who hear voices, relatives, friends and mental health professionals including therapists, social workers, nurses, psychiatrists and psychologists.

INTERVOICE was formed in 1997, at a meeting of voice hearers, family members and mental health workers was held in Maastricht, Netherlands to consider how to organise internationally further research and work about the subject of voice hearing. The meeting decided to create a formal organizational structure to provide administrative and coordinating support to the wide variety of initiatives in the different involved countries.

The organisation is structured as a network and was incorporated in 2007 as a non-profit company and charity under UK law. It operates under the name of International Hearing Voices Projects Ltd. The president is Marius Romme and the governing body is made up of people who hear voices and mental health practitioners.

Activities

Hearing Voices Groups
Hearing Voices Groups are based on an ethos of self-help, mutual respect and empathy. They provide a safe space for people to share their experiences and to support one another. They are peer support groups, involving social support and belonging, not necessarily therapy or treatment. Groups offer an opportunity for people to accept and live with their experiences in a way that helps them regain some power over their lives. There are hundreds of hearing voices groups and networks across the world. In 2014 there were more than 180 groups in the UK. These include groups for young people, people in prison, women and people from Black and Minority Ethnic communities.

World Hearing Voices Congress
INTERVOICE hosts the annual World Hearing Voices Congress. In 2015 the 7th Congress was held in Madrid, Spain, the 2016 Congress will be held in Paris, France. Previous conferences have been held in Maastricht, Netherlands, (2009); Nottingham, England (2010), Savona, Italy (2011), Cardiff, Wales (2012); Melbourne, Australia (2013); Thessaloniki, Greece (2014); Madrid, Spain (2015).

Annual World Hearing Voices Day
This is held on 14 September and celebrates hearing voices as part of the diversity of human experience, It seeks to increase awareness of the fact that you can hear voices and be healthy. It also challenges the negative attitudes towards people who hear voices and the assumption that hearing voices, in itself, is a sign of mental illness.

Research committee
INTERVOICE has an international research committee, that commissions research, encourages and supports exchanges and visits between member countries, the translation and publication of books and other literature on the subject of hearing voices and other related extraordinary experiences.

Criticism of the Hearing Voices Movement 
The Hearing Voices Movement has been criticised for its stance on medication and schizophrenia and for promoting non-medical and non-evidence-based approaches to severe mental illnesses in articles by Susan Inman from the Huffington Post, such as "People Who Hear Voices Need Science-Based Advice" in 2013, and "What You're not Hearing About the Hearing Voices Movement" in 2015.

Specific criticisms of the hearing voices approach include:

 using ideas that don't support science-based ways of understanding illness
 undermines people's trust in medical help that might be crucial to their wellbeing
 encourages people to focus on their voices when they may be having a hard time differentiating between what's real and what's not real
 doesn't recognize the very different needs of people with severe mental illnesses 
 by failing to differentiate between the needs of people who actually have psychotic disorders and those who don't, HVM poses serious risks
 poses real danger for the substantial number of people who lack insight into their psychotic disorder
 people struggling with psychotic symptoms shouldn't be advised to emphasize the meaning of auditory hallucinations

Appearances in media

 Hearing Voices, Horizon Documentary, BBC, UK (1995) 
 Angels and Demons directed by Sonya Pemberton, f2003; produced by ABC Commercial, in Enough Rope, Episode 162
 The Doctor Who Hears Voices, Channel 4, UK
 The voices in my head TED2013, Filmed February 2013 

A study investigating media reports of the experience of hearing voices found that 84% of the articles in the study contained no suggestion that voice-hearing can be ‘normal’. Half of those that did, put voice-hearing in a religious or spiritual context, for example considering the case of Joan of Arc. Most of the articles (81.8%) connected voice-hearing to mental illness. In some cases, auditory verbal hallucinations were simply equated with insanity.

Publications
 
 
 
 
 
 
 
 
 
 
 
   
Also published by Rijksuniversiteit Maastricht in the Netherlands.

See also

 Auditory hallucination
 Critical Psychiatry Network
 Demon
 Diagnosis of schizophrenia
 Hearing Voices Network
 Interpretation of Schizophrenia
 Neurodiversity
 Paranoia Network
 Peer support
 Psychiatric survivors movement
 Recovery approach
 Self-help groups for mental health
 Social construction of schizophrenia
 Trauma model of mental disorders

References

Further reading

Press
 Treatment of Schizophrenia Challenged In Western Australia The NewsMaker (Australia) 9 June 2011, "The Psychiatrist, the psychologist and the ex patient: a frank discussion on schizophrenia" Dr Dirk Corstens from the Netherlands, award-winning psychologist Eleanor Longden, and ex patient and Voices advocate Ron Coleman, discuss their expertise and experience on schizophrenia and voice hearing, as well as share innovative ways on the treatment of schizophrenia and management the experience.
 A first-class recovery: From hopeless case to graduate The Independent (UK) 25 October 2009, Eleanor Longden was a diagnosed schizophrenic and heard menacing voices in her head for 10 years.
 Embracing the dark voices within BBC News Online (UK), 3 September 2009
 I talk back to the voices in my head The Guardian (UK), 4 April 2009
 A dialogue with myself The Independent (UK), 15 April 2008, When Ruth began hearing voices, she turned to a controversial drug-free therapy programme. Now, her story is told in a powerful TV film
 Listening Cure Time/CNN (USA), 21 February 2008
 Can You Live With the Voices in Your Head? New York Times (USA), 25/03/2007
 Voices carry Boston Globe (USA), 25/03/2007
 The mad doctor: The extraordinary story of Dr Rufus May, the former psychiatric patient The Independent (UK), 18 March 2007
 Mad Medicine: A New Group for People Who Hear Voices Celebrates Mental Diversity Portland Mercury June 25, 2009
 Assiz. C (6 January 1991) Heard but not seen, Independent on Sunday

Articles
 
 
 
 
 
 
 
 
 
 
 
 
 
 
 
 
 
 
 
Also 
 
 
 
 
 
 
 
 
 
 
 
 
 
 
 
 
 
 
 
 
 
 
 Described in: 
 See also: 
 and: 
 
 
 
 
 

Voice Hearing Prevalence
 
 
 
 

Voice Hearing and Life Events
 
 
 
  
 
 
 

Working With Voices
 
 
 
 
 

Hearing Voices Groups

External links
 hearingvoicesusa.org (PDF) 
 childtrauma.org (PDF)
 

Mental health activists
Medical models
Health movements